Sharon J. Merchant (born August 30, 1963) is an American politician in the state of Florida. She was a representative in the Florida House of Representatives of the U.S. state of Florida. She received her Bachelor's degree from the Florida State University. She lives in Palm Beach Gardens, Florida.

References

External links
Official Bio for Representative Merchant

Florida State University alumni
Republican Party members of the Florida House of Representatives
1963 births
Living people
Women state legislators in Florida
21st-century American women